Drumahoe is a village and townland in County Londonderry, Northern Ireland. It lies to the east of Derry. It is home to Institute F.C., an NIFL Championship football club. The busy A6 road from Belfast to Derry passes through the townland. It is situated within Derry and Strabane district.

Demography
On Census Day 29 April 2001 the resident population of Drumahoe was 1,367. Of these:

 26.8% were under 16 years old and 11.2% were aged 60 and above 
 50.0% of the population were male and 50.0% were female 
 11.2% were from a Roman Catholic background and 85.7% were from a Protestant background 
 3.5% of those aged 16–74 were unemployed

See also

List of villages in Northern Ireland

References

Derry (city)
Townlands of County Londonderry
Derry and Strabane district